Overlord is a 2018 American science fiction action horror film directed by Julius Avery and written by Billy Ray and Mark L. Smith. It stars Jovan Adepo, Wyatt Russell, Mathilde Ollivier, John Magaro, Gianny Taufer, Pilou Asbæk, Bokeem Woodbine and Iain De Caestecker. The film was produced by J. J. Abrams, through his Bad Robot Productions banner, and Lindsey Weber. The plot follows several American soldiers who are dropped behind enemy lines the day before D-Day and discover terrifying Nazi experiments.

Overlord was released in the United States on November 9, 2018, by Paramount Pictures. The film grossed $41 million against a budget of $38 million.

Plot

On the eve of D-Day, a paratrooper squad, most of them in an integrated  unit, is sent to destroy a German radio-jamming tower in an old church. Their plane is shot down and crashes, and most of the squad, including squad leader Sgt. Rensin, are killed either in the crash or by Nazi soldiers and landmines. Four survivors remain: second-in-command Corporal Ford, Pfc. Boyce, Pfc. Tibbet, and Pvt. Chase.

The team continues onward and meets Chloe, a young woman from the village where the church is located. She lets them take refuge in her house. Chloe lives with her 8-year-old brother Paul and her aunt, who has been disfigured by Nazi experiments taking place in the church. After Tibbet and Chase depart to check the scheduled rendezvous site, a Nazi patrol led by SS Hauptsturmführer Wafner visits Chloe. Wafner sends his men away, and proceeds to coerce Chloe for sex, threatening to send her brother to the church to be "fixed." Boyce cannot ignore this and interrupts the Nazi officer. Ford is forced to follow suit and restrains Wafner.

Attempting to reach the rendezvous point to look for Tibbet and Chase, Boyce witnesses the Nazis burning disfigured village residents. He is chased by a dog and forced to hide in a truck carrying dead bodies into the church. Sneaking out of the truck, Boyce discovers an underground base that houses not only a radio operating room, but also a laboratory where the Germans perform various experiments on the villagers involving a mysterious serum and a large pit filled with black tar. Boyce takes a syringe containing the serum and rescues Rosenfeld, another member of the paratrooper squad, who was captured alive. They escape through the base's sewers.

When Boyce and Rosenfeld get back to Chloe's house, Tibbet and Chase have already returned. Wafner refuses to explain what the serum does, even as Ford tortures him. As the squad prepares to attack the church, Wafner attempts to escape, and fatally shoots Chase. Boyce, having seen a dead man supposedly resurrected by the serum in the lab, injects Chase with the syringe. Chase is resurrected, but soon mutates and turns violent. A scuffle ensues, ending with Boyce bludgeoning Chase to death. A patrol responding to the carnage arrives, and a shootout erupts in which the patrol is killed and Ford blows half of Wafner's face off. Wafner escapes with Paul as a hostage and back at the lab, injects himself with two doses of the serum.

Boyce proposes infiltrating the base and destroying the tower from the inside, which would also destroy the laboratory. The other privates support him, and Ford grudgingly agrees. Splitting up, Rosenfeld and Tibbet launch a frontal assault as a distraction, while Ford, Boyce, and Chloe enter the base using the sewers. Boyce and Ford plant the explosives, while Chloe looks for Paul. Chloe finds Paul, sends him back to the village, and successfully kills a mutated test subject who corners her. She returns to the village, where Tibbet and Rosenfeld are pursued by the base's defenders. Tibbet is wounded while shielding Paul from gunfire. Chloe kills the remaining Germans and treats Tibbet's wounds.

Wafner, now mutated and possessing superhuman strength and resilience, overpowers Ford and impales him on a meat hook. Wafner reveals that the serum was made by using the villagers' bodies to distill the ancient power of the black tar, which had been running under the village for centuries. The aim was to create immortal and invincible soldiers to serve the Reich. As Boyce distracts Wafner, Ford pulls the hook out and injects himself with the serum to heal his wounds. He holds off Wafner long enough for Boyce to set off an oxygen tank, which sends Wafner falling into the tar pit. As he begins to mutate, Ford orders Boyce to leave him behind and detonate the explosives, believing neither side should possess the serum. Boyce complies, and narrowly escapes as the church and jamming tower collapse behind him, killing Ford, Wafner, and the test subjects. He joins the others as a radio announces that the D-Day invasion concluded in a victory for the Allies.

In his report, Boyce credits Ford for the decision to plant the bombs inside the church. The commanding officer questions Boyce regarding rumors of an underground lab under the church. Boyce, sharing Ford's view, denies seeing anything worth digging up. The officer seemingly accepts his story, and informs him that they will be reassigned to C Company as the war continues.

Cast
 Jovan Adepo as Private First Class Edward Boyce, an idealistic African-American paratrooper and former member of "The Triple Nickels" who uncovers the Nazi experiments below the church and radio tower.
 Wyatt Russell as Corporal Lewis Ford, a paratrooper and explosives expert who is vehemently against swaying from the mission to destroy the radio tower.
 Pilou Asbæk as Captain Wafner, an SS Hauptsturmführer/Captain.
 Mathilde Ollivier as Chloe Laurent, Paul's sister and a French civilian who aides the stranded paratroopers.
 John Magaro as Private First Class Lyle Tibbet, a paratrooper and sniper.
 Bokeem Woodbine as Sergeant Rensin.
 Iain De Caestecker as Private Morton Chase, a paratrooper and photographer.
 Dominic Applewhite as Private First Class Jacob Rosenfeld, a paratrooper.
 Gianny Taufer as Paul Laurent, Chloe's younger brother
 Jacob Anderson as Private First Class Charlie Dawson, a paratrooper.
 Erich Redman as Dr. Schmidt, head of the experimentation on French civilians and dead German soldiers.
 Patrick Brammall as American Officer
 Mark McKenna as Private First Class Murphy
 Joseph Quinn as Grunauer
 Meg Foster as Chloe's Aunt

Production
The initial story for the film was conceived by J. J. Abrams and screenwriter Billy Ray, with Ray penning the script. Paramount acquired the film in 2017, and Mark L. Smith was brought in to polish the script. On February 1, 2017, Bad Robot Productions and Paramount Pictures announced that Julius Avery would direct the film. On January 18, 2018, the film was initially reported as being the fourth installment in the Cloverfield film series, though Abrams denied this at CinemaCon on April 25, 2018.

In April 2017, Jovan Adepo and Wyatt Russell were the first actors to be cast in the film. In May 2017, Mathilde Ollivier, John Magaro, Gianny Taufer, Pilou Asbæk, and Bokeem Woodbine were cast in supporting roles. Principal photography began in September 2017 and wrapped January 2018. Visual effects for the film were provided by Industrial Light & Magic, Image Engine, Rodeo FX, Pixomondo, Mr X,  Southbay and Nzviage. Mark Bakowski, Julian Foddy, Dan Seddon, Stefano Trivelli and Pauline Duvall served as visual effects supervisors.

Music 
The official motion picture soundtrack was released on digital only on November 9, 2018 by Paramount Music Corporation. The soundtrack was composed by Australian singer-songwriter and film composer Jed Kurzel, known for his previous work on the sci-fi film Alien: Covenant. This film is Kurzel's second collaboration with director Julius Avery, having previously worked together on Son of a Gun. Playing over the film's credits is the song "Bridging the Gap" by the rapper Nas, though this does not appear on the soundtrack.

Release
Overlord was originally scheduled to be released on October 26, 2018. However, in July 2018, it was pushed back to November 9, 2018.

Footage premiered at CinemaCon in April 2018, and the first trailer was released on July 18, 2018. The film premiered at Fantastic Fest 2018 on September 22.

Poster 
The primary theatrical poster for the film was first shown on September 12, 2018, with blood spatters on white backdrop, which appear to  represent the paratroopers in the film. The simplistic poster was designed by BLT Communications, which designed posters for films such as Frozen 2 and Game of Thrones. The poster went on the win the IMP Award for best poster of 2018.

Home video
The film was released on DVD and Blu-ray on February 19, 2019 and was available on Digital HD from Amazon Video and iTunes on February 18, 2019.

Reception

Box office
Overlord grossed $21.7 million in the United States and Canada, and $20 million in other territories, for a total worldwide gross of $41.7 million, against a production budget of $38 million.

In the United States and Canada, Overlord was released alongside The Girl in the Spider's Web and The Grinch, and was projected to gross $8–13 million from 2,859 theaters in its opening weekend. It made $3 million on its first day, including $900,000 from Thursday night previews. It went on to debut to $10.1 million, finishing third at the box office. The film fell 62% in its second weekend to $3.9 million, finishing eighth.

Critical response
On review aggregator Rotten Tomatoes, the film holds an approval rating of 81% based on 220 reviews and an average rating of 6.71/10. The website's critical consensus reads, "Part revisionist war drama, part zombie thriller, and part all-out genre gorefest, Overlord offers A-level fun for B-movie fans of multiple persuasions." On Metacritic, the film has a weighted average score of 60 out of 100 based on 28 critics, indicating "mixed or average reviews". Audiences polled by CinemaScore gave the film an average grade of "B" on an A+ to F scale, while PostTrak reported film-goers gave it three out of five stars.

Amy Nicholson of Variety wrote "Even at its most suspenseful, when Jed Kurzel's cello score stabs at the eardrums, Overlord feels familiar, a collage of cinematic nightmares checking off its influences: a woman wielding a flamethrower like Ripley in Aliens, a cruel SS officer (the terrifically hissable Pilou Asbæk) who grins like a Batman villain, and enough of a Castle Wolfenstein video-game vibe that its fans may find themselves reaching for the controls out of habit." While most reviews were positive, Michael Ordoña of the San Francisco Chronicle gave a rather scathing review, writing that the "enjoyment" one expects from GIs fighting zombies is "stunted by the film's lack of energy and imagination," and goes on to explain, "Director Julius Avery goes to the startle-scare early and often. Every turn, every beat feels too familiar. The writers didn't bother researching period lingo. Characters do idiotic things to enable plot devices. The screaming and gunfire seem excessive for a stealth mission. And the whole undead thing simply doesn't pay off." Although he does admit, "At least the makeup effects are quite good." John DeFoe of The Hollywood Reporter gave the film a positive review, writing: "As the team moves in on the laboratory and the radio tower above it, Avery balances the truly disgusting with more comic-book-like action...Still, the movie's tone holds together, with the lurid colors of opening scenes (the cinematic equivalent of a gory, pre-code war comic book) setting the stage for heightened action to come."

Corey Plante of Inverse addressed the films reluctance to “lean into stereotypes or depict racism for the sake of historical accuracy” with an interview with star Jovan Adepo. “We’re not trying to make a historical movie,” Adepo said, “casting was less about race and more about who has those characteristics that help put together the strongest cast possible.”

Accolades

Other sources
David Brin's science fiction short story, "Thor Meets Captain America", contains a similar premise, though it in addition features deities of the Norse pantheon, which are not present in this film's story.

References

External links
 
 
 
 

2018 horror films
2018 science fiction action films
2010s action horror films
2010s action war films
2010s science fiction horror films
American action horror films
American action war films
American science fiction action films
American science fiction horror films
American zombie films
Bad Robot Productions films
Films about the United States Army
Films directed by Julius Avery
Films produced by J. J. Abrams
Films scored by Jed Kurzel
Films shot in London
Films with screenplays by Billy Ray
Horror war films
Nazi zombie films
Operation Overlord films
Paramount Pictures films
Supernatural war films
American splatter films
Mad scientist films
2010s English-language films
2010s American films